Lieutenant general Depinder Singh, PVSM, VSM (born 1930, in Punjab, British India) was the overall commander of the IPKF in Sri Lanka from July 1987 to March 1990, He was the military assistant to Sam Manekshaw  from 1969 to 1973 during the Indo-Pakistani War of 1971.

Books
Singh has written a few books on his experience in the Indian army.
The IPKF in Sri Lanka  
Field Marshal Sam Manekshaw, M.C. : Soldiering with Dignity

Awards
Singh was conferred with the prestigious  Param Vishisht Seva Medal and Vishisht Seva Medal.

References

1930 births
Living people
 
Foreign intervention in the Sri Lankan Civil War
Indian generals
Recipients of the Param Vishisht Seva Medal
Recipients of the Vishisht Seva Medal